Liu Zongxiang (1897 – 1951) was a Chinese educator who served as president of Hanguang Private Girls' School from 1921 to 1924, and president of Hunan University from 1916 to 1917.

Names
His courtesy name was Yinxian, and his art name was Zhongyuan and Buguosheng.

Biography
Liu was born in Ningxiang County, Hunan, in 1897, during the Qing Empire. He attended Changsha Mingde School in 1904. He was accepted to Imperial University of Peking (now Peking University). After college, he was assigned to the Qing government as an officer, and later became a professor at Shanxi University. Liu returned to Changsha, Hunan in 1911. He taught at Hunan Zhonglu Normal School and worked as an editor of Hunan Education. He was president of Hunan University between 1916 and 1917. In 1921, he founded Han'guang Private Girls' School and served as its president. After the founding of the People's Republic of China, he became a staff member at Hunan Research Institute of Culture and History. He died in Changsha in 1951.

References

External links

1897 births
People from Ningxiang
1951 deaths
Educators from Hunan
Imperial University of Peking alumni
Presidents of Hunan University
Republic of China writers